St Vincent was an electoral district of the Legislative Assembly in the Australian state of New South Wales existing from 1856 until 1859. It was named after St Vincent County. It included Batemans Bay and the Jervis Bay area. It was largely replaced by Shoalhaven, while some of the southern portions became part of Braidwood and Eden.

Members for St Vincent

Election results

1856

1858

References

Saint Vincent
1856 establishments in Australia
1859 disestablishments in Australia